Gönül Yazar (born Mürşide Gönül Özyeğiner; 12 August 1936) is a Turkish singer and actress. 

In 1968 Yazar performed Marie Laforêt's song, "Mon amour, mon ami", in Turkish version as "Çapkın Kız".

Albums 
 Gönül Yazar - Halime (1968) (Şençalar Plak)
 Dertleri Zevk Edindim (1970/ 1977) (Arya Plak/ Yavuz Plak)
 Gönül Yazar - Nisan Yağmuru (1970) (Televizyon Plak)
 Gönül Yazar - O Ağacın Altı (1972) (Kervan Plak)
 Artık Bu Solan Bahçede (1973) (Atlas Plak)
 Çakıl Galası'nda (1974) (İstanbul Plak)
 Gönül Yazar - Ağlar Gezerim (1974) (Yavuz Plak)
 Gönül Yazar - Tadı Yok Sensiz Geçen Günlerimin (1975) (Yavuz Plak)
 Gönül Yazar/Süper Midi Play - Sen de Mevsimler Gibisin (1975) (Yavuz Plak)
 Aldırma Gönül (1978) (Elenor Plak)
 Taş Bebek (1979) (Elenor Plak)
 İşte Benim Dünyam (1982) (Elenor Plak)
 Gönül Defterim (1985) (Elenor Plak)
 Ne Yazar (19**) (Harika/MC)
 Gönül'den Gönüllere (1989) (Emre Plak)
 Sevmek İstiyorum (1993) (Elenor Plak)
 Forever (2010) (Ossi Müzik)

Compilation albums 
 Gönül Yazar'dan Seçmeler (1974) (Yavuz Plak)
 En İyileriyle Gönül Yazar (2006) (Ossi Müzik)

Movies 
 Taş Bebek, (1960)
 Bir Bahar Akşamı, (1961) 
 Bir Gecelik Gelin, (1962) 
 Ateşli Kan, (1962) 
 Kelepçeli Aşk, (1963) 
 Var mı Bana Yan Bakan, (1964) 
 Şu Kızların Elinden, (1964) 
 Sahte Sevgili, (1964) 
 Köye Giden Gelin, (1964) 
 Cımbız Ali, (1964) 
 Yalancının Mumu, (1965) 
 Kocamın Nişanlısı, (1965) 
 Hüseyin Baradan Çekilin Aradan, (1965) 
 Bir Garip Adam, (1965) 
 Bilen Kazanıyor, (1965) 
 Adım Çıkmış Sarhoşa, (1965) 
 65 Hüsnü, (1965) 
 Taçsız Kral, (1965) 
 Dudaktan Kalbe, (1965) 
 Namus Kanla Yazılır, (1966)
 Mezarını Hazırla, (1966) 
 Kanlı Mezar, (1966) 
 İdam Mahkumu, (1966) 
 Halime'yi Samanlıkta Vurdular, (1966) 
 Fakir Bir Kız Sevdim, (1966) 
 Beyoğlu'nda Vuruşanlar, (1966) 
 Trafik Belma, (1967) 
 Aslan Yürekli Reşat, (1967) 
 Kara Gözlüm Efkarlanma, (1968) 
 Ölüme Giden Yol, (1969) 
 Gel Desen Gelemem Ki, (1969) 
 Vurgun, (1973) 
 Tanık, (1992)

References

External links
 

1932 births
Living people
Actresses from İzmir
Turkish women singers
Turkish film actresses
20th-century Turkish actresses
Musicians from İzmir